"Hurts Like Hell" is a song recorded by American singer Madison Beer, featuring American rapper Offset of hip hop group Migos. The single was released through record label Access Records on November 9, 2018, through digital download and streaming formats. The song was written by Beer, Offset, and English singer Charli XCX, alongside the song's producers, The Invisible Men and Mike Sabath. It was originally intended to be the lead single from Beer's debut studio album, but was later removed from the album.

Background
"Hurts Like Hell" follows Beer's debut EP As She Pleases (2018), as well as her collaboration with (G)I-dle and Jaira Burns for the 2018 League of Legends World Championship, titled "Pop/Stars" (2018). Speaking about the track, Beer stated:

Composition
Musically, "Hurts Like Hell" is a dark pop song with a trap-influenced beat. It also contains a "pointed message" and a "bone-jarring chrous". Mike Nied, writing for Idolator, compared the song to Beer's previous single "Dead". Beer's vocals, which are distorted by synths in the song, were described by Billboard as "deep and soulful". Lyrically, it sees the singer dismissing a cheating ex, as she touts her success.

Critical reception
Nicole Engleman of Billboard, called the song "fierce". She additionally praised Offset's verse in the song, stating his vocals "add texture" to the song. Mike Nied, writing for Idolator, also complimented Offset's verse, calling it "perfectly at home on the beat," while also stating "it is definitely possible to imagine the pair dominating radio in the coming weeks".

Music video
A music video accompanied the release of "Hurts Like Hell". The witchcraft-inspired video sees the singer taking revenge on an abusive man. The singer later appears at his bedside with a knife, before a witch hunt begins that builds to the video's ending. Mike Wass of Idolator called the video "delightfully twisted".

Track listing
Digital download
"Hurts Like Hell" – 3:27

Acoustic version
"Hurts Like Hell" (Acoustic Live) – 2:57

Feenixpawl Remix
"Hurts like Hell" (Feenixpawl Remix) – 3:43

Charts

Certifications

References

2018 singles
2018 songs
Madison Beer songs
Offset (rapper) songs
Songs written by Offset (rapper)
Songs written by Charli XCX
Songs written by Jason Pebworth
Songs written by George Astasio
Songs written by Jon Shave
Song recordings produced by the Invisible Men
Songs about infidelity
Songs written by Mike Sabath